Alexander Gardner may refer to:
 Alexander Gardner (photographer) (1821–1882), Scottish photographer who emigrated to the United States
 Alexander Gardner (soldier) (1785–1877), traveller, soldier and mercenary
 Alex Gardner (baseball) (1861–1926), Canadian baseball player
 Alex Gardner (footballer) (1877–1952), Scottish footballer for Newcastle United
 Alex Gardner (singer) (born 1991), Scottish singer-songwriter now known as A-L-X